A Man, a Woman, and a Killer is a 1975 American drama film directed by Rick Schmidt and Wayne Wang.  It is Wang's directorial debut.

Plot
The story of a small-time gangster (Dick Richardson) writing his journal in a Mendocino, California, farmhouse, as he awaits a hit man who is coming to kill him. In this first part of a trilogy, realities continue to shift between the story, and the actual making of the film, as seen through unscripted scenes, real-life narrations by lead actors, and the real relationship that developed on the set between Richardson and the actress (Carolyn Zaremba) who played his girlfriend. A bumbling, local librarian (played by Ed Nylund) is mistaken for the "killer" and plays along with the game.

Cast
Dick Richardson as Dick
Ed Nylund as Ed
Carolyn Zaremba as Z

Production
The film was made in 1973 with a budget of $16,000.

Reception
A. H. Weiler of The New York Times gave the film a negative review and wrote that it "emerges as a largely static and undramatic film about the making of a film."

References

External links
 

1975 films
American drama films
Films directed by Wayne Wang
1975 directorial debut films
1975 drama films
1970s English-language films
1970s American films